Ausamah Saed better known as U$O (alternatively USO, Uso) also known as U-Dollartegn (meaning U-Dollar Signs)  (born 1981), is a rapper from Aarhus, Denmark, who released his debut album, Mr. Mista in 2000.

Associations
U$O he was a member of the now defunct rap group B.A.N.G.E.R.S. together with L.O.C. (real name Liam O'Conner) and N.I.S. (Niggeren i Slæden), and later Johnson. They released the EP VIP

U$O is also a member of the group F.I.P. (Full Impact Productions) together with L.O.C. and Suspekt.

Collaborations
He appeared on "Hey Shorty" (full title "Hey Shorty (Yeah Yeah Pt. 2)" by Kato's featuring U$O and Johnson. It reached #2 in the Danish Singles Chart.

He also appeared in the Tech N9ne 2011 single "Worldwide Choppers", also featuring Busta Rhymes, Ceza, D-Loc, JL of B. Hood, Twista, Twisted Insane and Yelawolf, from the album All 6's and 7's. It debuted on the U.S. Billboard Bubbling Under Hot 100 Singles chart at #4 and on the U.S. Billboard Heatseekers Songs chart at #15, becoming U$O's, D-Loc's, Ceza's, JL's, Twisted Insane's, and Yelawolf's most successful song in the U.S.

Discography

Albums

Mixtapes
2010: Got The Anlæg Going Åndssvag

Singles

Featured in

References

1981 births
Living people
Danish rappers
Danish hip hop musicians
Danish people of Moroccan descent